His Wife is a 1915 American silent drama film directed by George Foster Platt and starring Geraldine O'Brien, Holmes Herbert and Lorraine Huling.

Cast
 Geraldine O'Brien as Nora Dennys
 Holmes Herbert as John Dennys
 Lorraine Huling as Edith Danvers
 Inda Palmer as Aunt Nancy
 Theodore von Eltz as Harry Dennys

References

Bibliography
 Robert B. Connelly. The Silents: Silent Feature Films, 1910-36, Volume 40, Issue 2. December Press, 1998.

External links
 

1915 films
1915 drama films
1910s English-language films
American silent feature films
Silent American drama films
American black-and-white films
Films directed by George Foster Platt
Mutual Film films
1910s American films